Ryan Kahn (born November 10, 1977), known as a career coach and television personality. Ryan Kahn is founder of The Hired Group, author of Hired! The Guide for the Recent Grad, and star of Hired on MTV Networks.

Early life
Kahn, a Southern California native from Newport Coast, graduated with an undergraduate degree from California Polytechnic State University, San Luis Obispo. He continued his education with a focus degree in Music Business from UCLA’s Entertainment Studies program.

Career
While attending UCLA, Ryan interned for such entertainment powerhouses as The Firm, Inc., DC Management, and then Warner Music Group, where he was hired to work with some of music’s greats.

His success in garnering internships and passion for helping others led him to guest speaking spots at UCLA’s entertainment courses to discuss “How to Break into the Business.” Kahn continued advising young professionals by utilizing his extensive network to place hundreds of students in "dream opportunities".

Currently Ryan applies his experience as a Career Coach, Recruiter, Internship Coordinator and Founder of The Hired Group.

Personal life
As an avid music fan, Ryan spends his free time playing bass in a Los Angeles based band, The Night Riders which has headlined on Hollywood’s world-famous Sunset Strip. And, to help support and inspire the next generation of musicians, he founded Rock Start, a charity that donates musical instruments to children in need.

Filmography
MTV's Hired

Discography
The Night Riders, My Favorite Color is Blonde, lead bass and vocals (2010)

Elevation, Mystery of Sound, lead bass and vocals (2004)

Surefire, Self Titled, lead bass and vocals (2001)

Chewbacca and Friends, Self Titled, lead guitar (1996)

Charity work
Founder of Rock Start (2009)

Published works
Hired! The Guide for the Recent Grad

References

External links
 MTV Hired
 
 Ryan Kahn on USA TODAY
 Ryan Kahn of The Hired Group

Living people
Television personalities from California
1977 births
California Polytechnic State University alumni
University of California, Los Angeles alumni
People from Newport Beach, California